Juan Pablo Suárez may refer to:

 Juan Pablo Suárez (journalist) (born 1960s), Argentinian journalist
 Juan Pablo Suárez (cyclist) (born 1985), Colombian cyclist